The 2012 UCI Track Cycling World Championships was the World Championships for track cycling in 2012. They took place in Melbourne, Australia from 4 to 8 April 2012. The championships took place in the Hisense Arena which previously hosted the world championships in 2004 and from 2008 to 2010 a round of the World Cup as well as the track cycling at the 2006 Commonwealth Games.

The championships were also the final ranking event for the purposes of Olympic qualification. Ten of the nineteen World Championship disciplines are replicated at the 2012 Summer Olympics.

The championships were dominated by the rivalry between Australia and Great Britain, who shared 12 of the 19 gold medals available between them, including in eight of the ten Olympic events. Australia won the greatest total number of medals (15). while the British team led in Olympic events. Of the other nations, only Germany won more than one gold medal.

Several World Records were broken during the championship. Kristina Vogel and Miriam Welte started the hunt with a new record in the qualifying of the Team sprint, just to break the record once again during the final. Ed Clancy, Peter Kennaugh, Steven Burke and Geraint Thomas followed up with a new record during the Team pursuit final.
At the Women's Team pursuit competition, Dani King, Laura Trott and Joanna Rowsell set a new record. During the last day of the competition, Anna Meares set the last new world record in the 500 m time trial race on her way to the gold medal.

Schedule
The competition days will be split in Afternoon and Evening Sessions.

Medal summary

Shaded events are non-Olympic
Cyclists marked (*) raced in qualification round only

Medal table
After 19 events.

See also

 2011–12 UCI Track Cycling World Ranking
 2011–12 UCI Track Cycling World Cup Classics

References

External links

Results
Results book

 
UCI Track Cycling World Championships
UCI Track Cycling World Championships
UCI Track Cycling World Championships by year
International cycle races hosted by Australia
March 2012 sports events in Oceania